The Chief Khalsa Diwan is a 117-year-old Sikh organisation, which is the central Organization of various Singh Sabhas spread across Punjab, India. Unlike the Shiromani Gurudwara Prabandhak Committee, the Diwan is an apolitical body and only concerns itself with religious, educational and cultural issues.

At present, the Chief Khalsa Diwan Charitable Society runs
 48 schools
 3 colleges
 Orphanages
 Old age homes
 Khalsa Advocate - newsletter
 Hospitals and clinics

The organisation was founded with the active efforts of Bhai Vir Singh.

History
The Chief Khalsa Diwan was established in 1902 and setting up the Central Khalsa Orphanage was one of its first tasks. The orphanage opened on 11 April 1904.

As with other Sikh organisations, the Chief Khalsa Dewan strongly opposed the partition of India, which many Sikhs thought would create an environment of possible persecution.

Presidents
 S. Sunder Singh Majithia (1967-1982)
 S. Sujan Singh Sadana
 S. Kirpal Singh (former M.P.) remained the president for 17 consecutive years until his death, without any selection (through election), because of his goodwill with other members.
 Charanjit singh Chadha
 Dhanraj singh
 Dr. Santokh Singh 
 S. Nirmal Singh (2019 - 11th March, 2022)
 Dr. Inderbir Singh Nijjar (15th March, 2022 onwards)

Honorary secretary 
 S. Sant Singh
 S. Bhag Singh Ankhi
 S. Santokh Singh Sethi 
 S. Narinder Singh Khurana
 S. Swinder Singh Kagthunangal, former M.L.A. (current)
 S. Surinder Singh, (Rumalaye Wale, current)

Local committees and presidents
The Chief Khalsa Diwan Charitable Society has numerous branches, each autonomous but directly responsible to the Diwan Headquarters at Amritsar.
 Amritsar
 Chandigarh
 New Delhi
 Mumbai
 Kanpur
 Ludhiana
 Tarn Taran

References

External links
 

Sikh organisations
Organizations established in 1903
Organisations based in Punjab, India
Amritsar
1903 establishments in India